Mithila culture or Maithil culture refers to the culture which originated in the Mithila region of the Indian subcontinent. Mithila comprises Tirhut, Darbhanga, Kosi, Purnia, Munger, Bhagalpur and Santhal Pargana divisions of India and adjoining provinces of Province No. 1, Bagmati Pradesh, and Madhesh Province of Nepal.

Men and women in Mithila are very religious and dress  for the festivals as well. The costumes of Mithila stem from the rich traditional culture of Mithila. Panjabi Kurta and Dhoti with a Mithila Painting bordered  Maroon coloured Gamchha which is the Symbol of Passion, Love, Bravery and Courage are common clothing items for men. Men wear Gold ring in their nose which symbolizes prosperity, happiness and wealth inspired by Lord Vishnu. Also wear Balla on their wrist and Mithila Paag on their Head. In ancient times there was no colour option in Mithila, so the Maithil women wore white or yellow Saree with red Border but now they have a lot of variety and colour options and wear Laal-Paara (the traditional red-boarded white or yellow Saree) on some special occasions, and also wear Shakha-Pola  with lahthi in their hand which is Mandatory to wear after marriage in Mithila. In Mithila culture, this represents new beginnings, passion and prosperity. Red also represents the Hindu goddess Durga, a symbol of new beginnings and feminine power. During Chhaith, the women of Mithila wear pure cotton dhoti without stitching which reflects the pure, traditional Culture of Mithila. Usually crafted from pure cotton for daily use and from pure silk for more glamorous occasions, traditional attire for the women of Mithila includes Jamdani, Banarisi and Bhagalpuri and many more.  
Many festivals are celebrated throughout the year in Mithila. Chhaith, Durga Puja and Kali puja is celebrated as perhaps the most important of all the celebrations of Mithila.

Headgear

The Paag is a headdress native to the Mithila region worn by Maithil people. It is a symbol of honour and respect and a significant part of the Maithil culture.

Darbhanga MP Gopal Jee Thakur popularised the culture of honouring people with Mithila’s Paag on their head.

Dances
Jhijhiya, Dhuno-Naach and Domkach are the Cultural Dance of Mithila region of India and Nepal.
Jhijhiya is mostly performed at time of Dusshera, in dedication to Durga Bhairavi, the goddess of victory. While performing jhijhiya, women put lanterns made of clay on their head and they balance it while they dance.
Jhijhiya is performed in Darbhanga, Muzaffarpur, Madhubani and their Neighbour Districts on the other hand Dhuno-Naach is performed in Begusarai, Khagaria, Katihar, Naugachia during Durga Puja and Kalipuja with Shankha-Dhaak Sound.
Domkach is also a folk dance of the Mithila region.

Paintings

Mithila painting is practiced in the Mithila region of India and Nepal. It was traditionally created by the women of different communities of the Mithila region. It is named after Mithila in India which is where it originated. This painting as a form of wall art was practiced widely throughout the region; the more recent development of painting on paper and canvas originated among the villages around Madhubani, Begusarai, Darbhanga, Naugachia and it is these latter developments that may correctly be referred to as Madhubani art, Begusarai Art, Darbhanga Art, Naugachia Art.

Cuisine

Some traditional Maithil dishes are:
Dahi-Chura
Vegetable of Arikanchan
Ghooghni
Tarua of Tilkor
Bada
Badee
Dalpithhi
Maachh
Mutton
Irhar
Pidakia
Dal bhat
Makhan Payas
Anarasa
Bagiya

Main festivals 
 Chhath: Prayers during Chhath puja are dedicated to the solar deity, Surya, to show gratitude and thankfulness
 Saama-Chakeba: includes folk theater and song, celebrates the love between brothers and sisters and is based on a legend recounted in the Puranas.
 Aghaniya Chhaith (Chhotka Pabni): Very popular with the name of "Chhotka-Pabni" and Dopaharka Aragh in Mithila.Celebrated in Aghan Shukla-paksha Shasthi tithi.
 Baisakkha Chhaith (Chhotka Pabni): This is celebrated in month of Baishakh Shukla-paksha Shasthi tithi and It is also called Chhotka-Pabni(Dopaharka Aragh) in Mithila.
 Chaurchan: Along with Lord Ganesha, Lord Vishnu, Goddess Parvati and the moon god is worshipped. The story of Chorchan Puja is also heard on this day after that arghya is offered to the moon god (Chandra Deva).
 Jitiya: celebrated mainly in Indian states of Bihar, Jharkhand and Uttar Pradesh and Nepal; mothers fast (without water) for wellbeing of their children.
 Vivaha Panchami: Hindu festival celebrating the wedding of Rama and Sita. It is observed on the fifth day of the Shukla paksha or waxing phase of moon in the Agrahayana month (November – December) as per Maithili calendar and in the month of Margashirsha in the Hindu calendar. 
 Sita Navami
 Ganga Dussehra: Ganga Dussehra, also known as Gangavataran, is a Hindu festival celebrated by Maithils in Mokshdhaam Simaria Dhaam (The Welcome Gate of Mithila). avatarana (descent) of the Ganges. It is believed by Hindus that the holy river Ganges descended from heaven to earth on this day. 
 Kalpwas: Celebrated in Every Kartik Month in Simaria Dhaam, Begushorai.
 Kojagiri (Lachhmi Puja): harvest festival marking the end of monsoon season 
 Paata Puja (Durga Maay Aagmon)
 Khutti Puja (Ritual of Durga Puja)
 Mohalaya 
 Durga Puja: a ten-day festival, of which the last five are of the most significance. is an important festival in the Shaktism tradition of Hinduism. It marks the victory of goddess Durga in her battle against the shape-shifting asura, Mahishasura. Thus, the festival epitomizes the victory of good over evil, though it is also in part a harvest festival celebrating the goddess as the motherly power behind all of life and creation.
 Kali Puja: dedicated to the Hindu goddess Kali, celebrated on the new moon day Dipannita Amavasya of the Hindu month Kartik
 Saraswati Puja: marks the preparation for the arrival of spring. The festival is celebrated by people of Dharmic religions in the South Asian countries in different ways depending on the region. Vasant Panchami also marks the start of preparation for Holika and Holi, which take place forty days later. 
 Rama Navami: celebrates the descent of Vishnu as the Rama avatar, through his birth to King Dasharatha and Queen Kausalya in Ayodhya, Kosala. 
 Basanti Puja (Chaiti Durga Puja)
 Til Sakraait
 Aakhar Bochhor
 Pahun Shashthi
 Naag Panchami
 Barsaait
 Vishwakarma Puja
 Holi
 Ghadi Paabain

See also
Indian culture
Nepalese culture
Maithili language
Mithila, India 
Mithila, Nepal

References and footnotes
Notes

Culture of Mithila
Indian culture
Nepalese culture